James Barry (15 January 1661 – 16 April 1725) was an Irish politician.

Barry was a Member of Parliament (MP) in the Irish House of Commons and represented Naas from 1695 to 1699 and from 1711 to 1713. He sat then for Kildare Borough from 1715 to 1725.

References

 https://web.archive.org/web/20090601105535/http://www.leighrayment.com/commons/irelandcommons.htm
 http://www.thepeerage.com/p26878.htm#i268773

1661 births
1725 deaths
Irish MPs 1695–1699
Irish MPs 1703–1713
Irish MPs 1715–1727
Members of the Parliament of Ireland (pre-1801) for County Kildare constituencies